David Cook (born 12 January 1969) is a British former cyclist. Cook competed in the individual road race at the 1992 Summer Olympics. He also represented England in the road race, at the 1990 Commonwealth Games in Auckland, New Zealand.

References

External links
 

1969 births
Living people
British male cyclists
Olympic cyclists of Great Britain
Cyclists at the 1992 Summer Olympics
Sportspeople from Darlington
Cyclists at the 1990 Commonwealth Games
Commonwealth Games competitors for England